Santhoshi is an Indian actress. She is probably best known for her performances in the films Bala, Jai and Honeymoon Express and most prominently for her performance in the mainstream TV series Arasi. She won Nandi Award for Best Female Comedian for her role in Nuvvostanante Nenoddantana.

Career
Santhoshi was born to Gopala Krishna Moorthy and television actress Poornima  in Chennai, India. She first appeared in a television series, when she was eight years old, acting alongside her mother. She then debuted in the Tamil film Baba (2002), starring Rajinikanth, playing the sister of Manisha Koirala. Subsequently, she played supporting roles in several Tamil films as Aasai Aasaiyai (2002), Bala (2002), Maaran (2002) and Military (2003), before enacting lead female roles and foraying into other South Indian film industries as well. She played the second female lead in Samuthirakani's Unnai Charanadaindhen (2003) and also played a starring role in Kadhal Samrajyam directed by National Film Award-winning director Agathiyan; the latter, however, remains unreleased. She made her debut in the Telugu film industry with the film Jai (2004) opposite Navdeep and debuted in Kannada in 2006 with the film Honeymoon Express. She also appeared in popular Telugu films such as Nuvvostanante Nenoddantana (2005) and Bangaram (2006), enacting supporting roles. Her performance in the former fetched her the Nandi Award for Best Female Comedian. From 2007, she appeared in the popular series Arasi, playing the role of Kalaiarasi, the daughter of series' protagonist Arasi, portrayed by Raadhika. She was crowned "Miss Chinnathirai 2007" at a beauty contest organized for television actresses.

Filmography

Television

References

External links
 
 Santhoshi at Joint Scene

Living people
Indian film actresses
Tamil actresses
Indian television actresses
Actresses from Chennai
1987 births
Actresses in Tamil cinema
Nandi Award winners
Actresses in Telugu cinema
21st-century Indian actresses
Actresses in Tamil television